Raffaella Baracchi (born Turin, Italy on 25 March 1964) is a retired Italian actress and 1983 Miss Italia.

Miss Italia
Raffaella Baracchi, by the year 1983 and as Miss Piedmont, won the Miss Italia contest and represented Italy at the Miss Universe 1984.

Film career
Baracchi made her cinema debut in 1986 with Maurizio Ponzi's poliziottesco-comedy Il tenente dei carabinieri. She appeared in Ruggero Deodato's The Barbarians in 1987 and in Deodato's 1988 giallo Phantom of Death as prostitute Laura. She also appeared in the same year in Tinto Brass's neo-noir Snack Bar Budapest where she played the prostitute Milena.

Personal life
Baracchi married actor Domiziano Arcangeli in 1988; the same year, she met actor and director Carmelo Bene with whom she started a relationship.  Her marriage to Arcangeli was annulled and in early 1992 she married Bene.

The couple had a daughter named Salomè (b. 1993) after the 1964 play by Bene.

References

External links

1964 births
Italian beauty pageant winners
Italian female models
Italian film actresses
Living people
Miss Universe 1984 contestants
Actors from Turin
Models from Turin